Acento Latino is  a biweekly newspaper based in Fayetteville, North Carolina for the Latino community.

References

Non-English-language newspapers published in North Carolina
Mass media in Fayetteville, North Carolina
1999 establishments in North Carolina
Spanish-language newspapers published in the United States